Soundaranayakipuram is a village in the Pattukkottai taluk of Thanjavur district, Tamil Nadu, India.

Demographics 

As per the 2001 census, Soundaranayakipuram had a total population of 1341 with 632 males and 709 females. The sex ratio was 1/1.22. The literacy rate was 63.64.

References 

 

Villages in Thanjavur district